The team dressage at the 2008 Summer Olympics took place between August 13 and 14 at the Hong Kong Sports Institute. Each horse and rider pair performed an FEI Grand Prix Test. The Grand Prix Test consists of a battery of required movements that each rider and horse pair performs. Five judges evaluate the pair, giving marks between 0 and 10 for each element. The judges' scores were averaged to give a final score for the pair. The best three scores from each team's four members were summed to give a team score.

The results from this event also served as a qualifier for the individual dressage event.

Medalists

Results

*Courtney King and Mythilus were sanctioned on September 22, 2008, which led to the disqualification of the US Dressage team.

References

 Competition format
 Result

Equestrian at the 2008 Summer Olympics